Darío Ferreira (born 9 February 1987 in Rocha) is a Uruguayan professional footballer, currently playing for Xelajú MC in the Liga Nacional de Guatemala.

Teams
  Nacional 2007–2008
  Bella Vista 2008–2009
  Montevideo Wanderers 2009–2010
  Cerro 2010–2011
  Boca Unidos 2011–2012
  Alvarado de Mar del Plata 2012–2013
 Rocha F.C 2013 2015
 Deportivo Maldonado 2016 2017
  Alianza 2017–2018
  Xelajú 2019–Presente

References

External links
 Profile at BDFA 
 Darío Ferreira at Soccerway 

1987 births
Living people
Uruguayan footballers
Uruguayan expatriate footballers
Club Nacional de Football players
Montevideo Wanderers F.C. players
C.A. Bella Vista players
C.A. Cerro players
Boca Unidos footballers
Expatriate footballers in Argentina
Association footballers not categorized by position